Dschang Airport  is a public use airport located  south-southeast of Dschang, Ouest, Cameroon.

See also
List of airports in Cameroon

References

External links 
 Airport record for Dschang Airport at Landings.com

Airports in Cameroon
West Region (Cameroon)